Mr. Christmas is the sixth studio album American country music singer Brett Eldredge, released on October 22, 2021, by Atlantic Nashville. This is his second Christmas album after Glow (2016). The album features cover songs of Christmas songs as well as two originals.

Background
Eldredge announced his second Christmas album in September 2021. The album features two original songs that Eldredge co-wrote with long-time collaborator Ross Copperman.

Release and promotion
Mr. Christmas was released on October 22, 2021, by Atlantic Nashville. "It's the Most Wonderful Time of the Year" was released as a single ahead of the album. From November 13 to December 30, 2021, Eldredge promoted the album on his Glow Live Tour. 

On November 29, 2021 he appeared on CMA Country Christmas and performed  "Merry Christmas Baby".

Critical reception
Pip Ellwood-Hughes of Entertainment Focus says that "Eldredge is making a convincing case to be mentioned in the same breath as Michael Bublé and Mariah Carey when it comes to Christmas music." Ellwood-Hughes also praised his rendition of "It's the Most Wonderful Time of the Year", "Eldredge immediately transports you back to the golden age of the big band as his velvety voice wraps around the festive classic and the orchestra behind him wows with their stunning instrumentation."

The Cedar Rapids Gazette Alan Sculley also mentioned Bublé but said that "Eldredge might give Michael Bublé a run for his money as music's leading Sinatra-esque Christmas crooner."

Track listing

Personnel
Credits adapted from AllMusic.
Vocals
Brett Eldredge – all vocals
Nicki Richards — background vocals 
Catherine Russell – background vocals 
Anthony Snitzer – soloist
David Spinozza – soloist 

Musicians

Emily Brausa – cello
Claire Chan – violin 
Tom Cobb - contrabass 
Jonathan Dinklage – viola 
David Finck - bass 
Aaron Heick – alto saxophone
Jen Herman – viola 
Clarice Jensen – cello
Tony Kadleck – trumpet 
Adda Kridler - violin 
Brandon Lee – trumpet 
Ann Lehmann – violin 
Matthew Lehmann – violin 
Dennis Mackrel – drums 
Nick Marchione – trumpet
Lisa Matricardi — viola 
Maixm Moston – viola 
Rob Mounsey – piano 
Jeff Nelson — bass trombone
Tomina Parvanova – harp 
Charles Pillow – alto saxophone
Dave Riekenberg – alto saxophone 
Benjamin Russell – violin
Antoine Silverman – violin 
Andy Snitzer – tenor saxophone
David Spinozza – guitar 
Entcho Todorov – violin
Scott Wendholt — trumpet 
Anja Wood – cello
Emily Yarbrough – violin

Production

Thom Beemer – pro tools
Joe Cilento – assistant 
Joe D'Ambrosio – production coordination 
Mark Dupree - creative director
Tiffany Gifford – stylist 
Scott Hendricks – A&R
Edwin Huet – pro tools
Natasha Leibel – grooming 
Henry Wadsworth Longfellow – arranger 
Mike Moore – art direction, design
Carlos Mora – assistant 
Rob Mounsey – arranger, producer
Ian Muir – assistant 
Jay Newland – engineer, mixing, producer
Frederick Oakeley – arranger 
John Peets – management 
James Pierpont — arranger 
Steve Sacco – assistant
Antoine Silverman – concert master 
John Francis Wade – arranger 
Mark Wilder — mastering
James Younger – artist development

Release history

References

2021 Christmas albums
Atlantic Records albums
Brett Eldredge albums
Christmas albums by American artists
Country Christmas albums